Bertrand Tietsia (born 27 October 1972) is a Cameroonian boxer. He competed in the men's middleweight event at the 1996 Summer Olympics.

References

1972 births
Living people
Cameroonian male boxers
Olympic boxers of Cameroon
Boxers at the 1996 Summer Olympics
Place of birth missing (living people)
Middleweight boxers
20th-century Cameroonian people